A statue of Boston mayor and state governor Maurice J. Tobin by Emilius R. Ciampa is installed along the city's Charles River Esplanade, in the U.S. state of Massachusetts.

Description and history
The 1958 bronze sculpture is approximately 10 ft. tall and 2 ft. wide, and rests on a granite base that measures approximately 6 x 4 x 2 ft. The work was commissioned by the Commonwealth of Massachusetts, and surveyed by the Smithsonian Institution's "Save Outdoor Sculpture!" program in 1997.

See also

 1958 in art

References

1958 establishments in Massachusetts
1958 sculptures
Bronze sculptures in Massachusetts
Charles River Esplanade
Granite sculptures in Massachusetts
Monuments and memorials in Boston
Outdoor sculptures in Boston
Sculptures of men in Massachusetts
Statues in Boston